Sacred Heart of Jesus Church is an old church in Kermanshah. this church made by order of Bishop Johannanyan in 1914. on August 7, 2004, registered as Iranian national heritage with 11059 registration number. main facade of the church decorated with a Santoor which embed in the middle of a cross-shaped skylight.

See also 
 Cultural Heritage, Handicrafts and Tourism Organization of Iran

References 

National works of Iran
Buildings and structures in Kermanshah
Churches in Iran
1914 in Iran